Diastatomma is a genus of dragonfly in the family Gomphidae. It contains the following species:

Diastatomma bicolor 
Diastatomma gamblesi 
Diastatomma multilineata 
Diastatomma ruwenzorica 
Diastatomma selysi 
Diastatomma soror 
Diastatomma tricolor

References

Gomphidae
Anisoptera genera
Taxa named by Hermann Burmeister
Taxonomy articles created by Polbot